Topias may refer to:

 Thopia family, one of the most powerful Albanian feudal families in the Late Middle Ages
 Topias Palmi, a Finnish basketball player
 Topias Taavitsainen, better known as Topson, a Finnish professional Dota 2 player